The Protected Natural Areas Programme (PNAP) of New Zealand began in 1981 as a means of evaluating areas worthy of protection. As part of the programme a series of ecological districts have been created and 83 of the approximately 270 had been surveyed by 2001.

The Reserves Act 1977 was the legislative basis for the programme.

See also
Conservation in New Zealand

References

Further reading

Conservation projects in New Zealand
Protected areas of New Zealand
1981 in New Zealand
1981 in the environment
1981 in New Zealand law